Kocher manoeuvre is a surgical manoeuvre to expose structures in the retroperitoneum behind the duodenum and pancreas. In vascular surgery, it is described as a method to expose the abdominal aorta. It usually has been in contrast with MLRRD (midline Laparotomy and right retroperitoneal space dissection). The Kocher manoeuvre and MLRRD have been used for diverse cases, but they have approximately equivalent outcomes.

The Kocher manoeuvre may also refer to a procedure used to reduce anterior shoulder dislocations by externally rotating the shoulder, before adducting and internally rotating it.

Uses 
The Kocher manoeuvre may be used to control bleeding from the inferior vena cava or aorta. It may also be used in pancreaticoduodenectomy, such as to facilitate removal of a pancreatic tumour.

Technique 
The peritoneum is incised at the right edge of the duodenum, and the duodenum and the head of pancreas are reflected to the opposite direction; that is, to the left.

History 
The Kocher manoeuvre is named for the Nobel Prize–winning surgeon Emil Theodor Kocher.

References

External links
 The incidence of tumours in the pancreatic head ...
Abdominal surgical procedures